The 1977 European Figure Skating Championships was a senior-level international competition held in Helsinki, Finland. Elite senior-level figure skaters from European ISU member nations competed for the title of European Champion in the disciplines of men's singles, ladies' singles, pair skating, and ice dancing.

Results

Men

Ladies

Pairs

Ice dancing

References

External links
 results

European Figure Skating Championships, 1977
European Figure Skating Championships, 1977
European Figure Skating Championships
International figure skating competitions hosted by Finland
International sports competitions in Helsinki
1970s in Helsinki